Cirsium turneri is a North American species of plants in the tribe Cardueae within the family Asteraceae. Common names include cliff thistle. The species grows in crevices in limestone cliffs in northern Mexico (Chihuahua, Coahuila) and western Texas (Brewster, Terrell, Val Verde Counties).

Cirsium turneri is a perennial herb up to 45 cm (18 inches) tall. Leaves have small, narrow spines along the edges. Flower heads are sometimes produced one at a time, sometimes in small groups, each head with red or reddish-purple disc florets but no ray florets.

References

External links
Photo of herbarium specimen at Missouri Botanical Garden, collected in Texas, isotype of Cirsium turneri

turneri
Flora of North America
Plants described in 1960